Lilian Bernard Pierre Nalis (born 29 September 1971) is a French former professional footballer current assistant manager Ligue 1 club of RC Lens. 

Nalis played in Ligue 1 for Caen, Guingamp, Le Havre and SC Bastia, Serie A for Chievo, the Premier League for Leicester City, and the Football League for Leicester, Sheffield United, Coventry City, Plymouth Argyle and Swindon Town.

Career
Born in Nogent-sur-Marne, Nalis started his career in his home country of France, playing for a wide variety of French clubs including Le Havre, Caen, Guingamp and Bastia.  After three seasons with Bastia, Nalis moved onto the Italian side Chievo.

After a bad spell of form at Chievo, Nalis was sold to English side Leicester City in 2003 who had just earned promotion to the Premiership.  Despite Leicester being relegated straight back to the Football League Championship, Nalis stayed with the team.  His only premiership goal for City was one of his best, scoring against Leeds United with a smashing 25 yard volley in 2003.

During the summer 2005, Nalis was transferred to Sheffield United but after losing his place in the side early in the season, he went on loan with Coventry City before moving to Plymouth Argyle in January 2006. Nalis was voted the fans player of the year for the 2006–7 season and signed a one-year extension to his contract.

It was announced in April 2008 that Nalis, would be released by Plymouth Argyle, when his contract expires in June.

On 31 July 2008, Nalis signed for Swindon following a brief trial.

After his final season in England, Nalis returned to France, by signing for the Corsica-based side of CA Bastia.

Coaching career
After retiring at the end of the 2009–10 season, Nalis was appointed assistant manager of CA Bastia. He worked for the club until the summer 2014, where he was appointed assistant manager of Stade Laval. He was at the club for two and a half years, before joining AC Le Havre, also as an assistant manager.

On 10 July 2019, SC Bastia announced, that Nalis had returned to the club as a technical advisor for the club's academy.

On 9 May 2020, it was announced that Nalis would be joining RC Lens as one of the assistants to Franck Haise.

References

External links
 

1971 births
Living people
Sportspeople from Nogent-sur-Marne
French footballers
Association football midfielders
AJ Auxerre players
Stade Malherbe Caen players
Stade Lavallois players
En Avant Guingamp players
Le Havre AC players
SC Bastia players
A.C. ChievoVerona players
Leicester City F.C. players
Sheffield United F.C. players
Coventry City F.C. players
Plymouth Argyle F.C. players
Swindon Town F.C. players
CA Bastia players
Ligue 1 players
Ligue 2 players
Serie A players
Premier League players
English Football League players
French expatriate footballers
Expatriate footballers in England
Expatriate footballers in Italy
Footballers from Val-de-Marne